Markgraf (margrave) is a Germanic title, equivalent of marquis (marquess)

Markgraf may also refer to:

People
 Friedrich Markgraf (1897–1987), German botanist
 Kate Markgraf (born 1976), American soccer defender
 Maida Markgraf (born 1991), Montenegrin footballer

Other uses
 SMS Markgraf, a König-class battleship

See also

 Horst-Tanu Margraf (1903−1978), German conductor
 Georg Marcgrave (Marggraf) (1610–1644), German naturalist and astronomer
 
 
 
 Margrave (disambiguation)
 Marquis (disambiguation)
 Marquess (disambiguation)

Occupational surnames